Harold Finch is a fictional character from the CBS crime drama television series Person of Interest. He is played by Michael Emerson, and in scenes from his past by Parker Brightman (child) and Chris Bert (teenager). Finch is a reclusive, eccentric billionaire software engineer who developed a machine to analyse surveillance data and identify individuals with premeditated homicidal intent or who will be the victims of impending homicide attempts. He recruits John Reese, a former Green Beret and CIA operative, to help him prevent crimes related to the 'people of interest' that the Machine identifies. He is also known by a series of aliases, many of which relate to birds. A quirky and mysterious character, Finch tends to keep his personal life a secret as he rebuffs Reese's numerous attempts to learn more about him.

Background
Born in Lassiter, Iowa, Harold was raised on a farm by his father; his mother, Margaret Chamberlin, is indicated to have been absent from at least age eight.  A child prodigy, he displayed early skills in the fields of mechanical engineering and computer science. With his father suffering early-onset dementia, Finch grew increasingly interested in artificial intelligence and human-computer interaction. After hacking into the early military Internet to acquire more memory for the machine he was building, Finch became the subject of a federal investigation and began living under a false identity.

Finch entered MIT under the assumed name 'Harold Wren', where he and classmate Nathan Ingram co-founded the computer company 'IFT'. After Finch graduated from MIT he arranged that Ingram was to be the public face of the hugely successful business while Finch remained unseen, accumulating billions of dollars without having a public profile.

After the September 11 attacks, Finch and Ingram began creating a mass-surveillance machine that used artificial intelligence to predict terrorist attacks by analysing government feeds from emails, phone calls, and surveillance cameras. The machine also generated a list of predicted murders and violent crimes classified as "non-relevant to national security". As passing the generated information could reveal the existence and extent of constitutionally proscribed government surveillance, Finch programmed the machine to delete the non-relevant list every day at midnight. Finch and Ingram clashed when Finch discovered that Ingram had created a backdoor into the machine to access the non-relevant list before handing it over to the government and was trying to warn and even save people on the "irrelevant list". Finch shut down the backdoor.

Ingram's disagreement with Finch led him to contact a journalist with the intention of exposing the surveillance program. Anxious to stop him, Finch arrived at their meeting place at a ferry terminal to see Ingram murdered in an apparent terrorist bombing that also claimed dozens of innocent lives. Badly injured himself, Finch was taken to the temporary triage. Suspecting the attack was a government-sponsored attempt to kill Ingram, and understanding for the first time the lengths to which elements of the government would go to maintain the machine as secret, Finch allowed his fiancée Grace Hendricks to believe he was killed in the bombing. At the secret library location where Ingram had created his backdoor to the machine, Finch reactivated the backdoor and began his own mission to save the non-relevant numbers.

Finch is wanted for treason from 1974 and is connected with fifteen open homicides.

Beginning war on crime

Finch recruits Rick Dillinger, a former Blackwater mercenary, to help with his mission. However, their relationship is uneasy because of ethical differences. The machine provides Finch and Dillinger the number of Daniel Casey, a computer hacker who tests computer security systems. Dillinger observes that Casey is being pursued by multiple third parties, including the head of the Office of Special Counsel, a high-ranking U.S. espionage agent known as Control, and CIA agents John Reese and Kara Stanton. Dillinger rescues Casey and takes him to Finch, who is sympathetic to Casey's predicament. Examining Casey's laptop he concludes that it should be sold at auction, but later creates and installs onto the laptop a virus intended to give the surveillance machine more autonomy. Dillinger, who secretly planted a bug to listen in their conversation, decides to drug Finch and steal the laptop.

Finch follows Dillinger to Central Park and watches from behind a tree as Dillinger meets with the buyers of the laptop. After the laptop changes hands, I.S.A. agent Sameen Shaw fires at the group. The buyers flee, then Shaw shoots Dillinger in the chest. Finch makes his way to Casey and Reese's encounter. Finch watches as Reese lies to Kara and tells her Casey is dead. Reese tells Casey that he doesn't deserve to die and provides him safe passage to Canada. Seeing Reese's skills and strong sense of moral duty, Finch begins considering him as replacement for Dillinger.

Activities with John Reese

When Finch first makes contact with John Reese, Reese is homeless and suffering from depression following the death of his lover, Jessica. Defending himself against subway thugs leads Reese to be arrested and questioned by Detective Joss Carter. Finch gets him out of police custody with the help of a costly lawyer and tells him that he needs a purpose and a job, explaining that what he can offer is a "chance to be there in time". After initially refusing, Reese begins on his first case, watching assistant district attorney Diane Hansen.

During his first job Reese blackmails Detective Lionel Fusco to be their informant in the NYPD. When Reese completes the case, Finch tells him there will be more jobs coming. As their friendship starts to evolve in the series Reese becomes increasingly protective of Finch, particularly following Finch's kidnapping by Root. Reese gives Finch his dog Bear as a companion and for protection when Reese is not around.

Although reluctant at first, Finch increasingly assists Reese in the field, growing in confidence as he does.

After the death of Root, Finch goes on a rogue mission to destroy a corrupt A.I. called Samaritan. Guided by the Machine, Finch uploads the Ice-9 virus to Samaritan in episode titled ".exe" but it has global side effects. In the series finale episode titled "return 0", Reese and Finch work together one last time to destroy a Samaritan copy that uploaded itself to an orbiting satellite. Wounded, Finch attempts to sacrifice himself to upload a copy of the Machine to destroy Samaritan, but is tricked by Reese who sacrifices himself in his place. With Samaritan destroyed and having been reminded of the value of life by the Machine and Reese, Finch travels to Italy to be reunited with his fiancé and perhaps even a normal life.

Skills
Throughout the series, Finch displays his extraordinary expertise with computer hacking and advanced technology. As a result of his injury from the ferry bombing, he is unable to fully turn his head, has rigid posture, and walks with a limp. In contrast to Reese, he lacks hand-to-hand combat techniques due to his physical limitations, but he prefers to use self-defense and a non-lethal weapons such as Tasers when he stunned an NYPD officer inside the morgue in order to help Reese and Carter escape from HR.  He is adamantly against the use of guns.

References

External links
 

Fictional businesspeople
Fictional characters from Iowa
Fictional characters with neurotrauma
Fictional child prodigies
Fictional hackers
Fictional inventors
Fictional scientists in television
Fictional software engineers
Fictional vigilantes
Television characters introduced in 2011
Person of Interest (TV series)